A  is a traditional Japanese kitchen utensil, similar to a wood plane or mandoline. It is used to shave , dried blocks of skipjack tuna.

The resulting shavings are captured in a wooden drawer at the bottom of the instrument and retrieved by opening and emptying the shavings that are roughly sorted into two sizes for different uses.

The shavings are a staple of Japanese cuisine.

See also
Mandoline
, the category of graters used in Japanese cooking

References

Japanese food preparation utensils
Japanese words and phrases